ABCD: American Born Confused Desi may refer to:

 ABCD: American-Born Confused Desi (2013 film)
 ABCD: American Born Confused Desi (2019 film)